Suborna Mustafa (born 2 December 1960) is a Bangladeshi television, film and stage actress. She is the current Jatiya Sangsad member representing the Reserved Women's Seat-4 since February 2019. She is a member of Bangladesh Awami League party.

Mustafa is notable for her roles in television drama serials including Kothao Keu Nei (1990), Aaj Robibar (1999) and Ayomoy (1991). She won Bangladesh National Film Award for Best Supporting Actress twice for her performance in the films Notun Bou (1983) and Gohin Baluchor (2017). She was awarded Ekushey Padak in culture category by  the Government of Bangladesh in 2019.

Early life and education
Mustafa was born on 2 December 1960 in Dopdopiya Union, Nalchity Upazila, Jhalokati District. Her parents were Golam Mustafa, a film and television actor, and Husne Ara Mustafa, a radio producer of All India Radio, Radio Pakistan and Bangladesh Betar. She has a sister, Camelia Mustafa. Mustafa mostly spent at her maternal grandparents' house on Elephant Road in Dhaka and studied in Viqarunnisa Noon School.

Career
Mustafa debuted in acting in the television drama Baraf Gala Nadi, based on a novel by Zahir Raihan. She acted in the drama Rokte Angur Lata with Afzal Hossain. She also acted in first ever package drama serial of Bangladesh Television, Shilpi, directed by Mamunur Rashid.

Her roles include appearing as one of the main characters in Dolls House (2007–2009), a Bengali-language drama-serial which first aired on the television channel ATN Bangla.

Mustafa made her stage acting debut through Jaundice O Bibidho Balloon by Al Mansur. She debuted in directing through a single-episode play, Akash Kushum for ATN Bangla in 2009.

Mustafa made her film debut in Ghuddi (1980). In 1984, she acted in Noyoner Alo, along with Zafar Iqbal. She later acted in Lal Shobujer Pala, Palabi Kothay, Suruj Miah, Opohoron, Durotto, Headmaster, Commander, Khondo Golpo 71, Ankhi O Tar Bondhura and Shonkhonil Karagar.

A long-time cricket fan, Mustafa has been a commentator on the sport for Radio Bhumi since 2015.  As a member of the Censor Board, she participates in the National Film Awards selection.

Works

Television drama plays

Films

Web series
 Beauty and the Bullet (2019)

Personal life
In 1984s, Mustafa married Humayun Faridi, another Bangladeshi actor. They were divorced on 18 March 2008. Later she married Badrul Anam Saud, co-director of Dolls House, in July 2008.

References

External links
 

Living people
1959 births
Bangladeshi television actresses
Bangladeshi film actresses
Bangladeshi stage actresses
Best Supporting Actress National Film Award (Bangladesh) winners
Recipients of the Ekushey Padak in arts
Best TV Actress Meril-Prothom Alo Critics Choice Award winners
Best Actress Bachsas Award winners
21st-century Bangladeshi women politicians
Women members of the Jatiya Sangsad